Jeffrey D. Brown is an American film and television director, film producer and screenwriter. He is best known for the directing, producing and writing the short film Molly's Pilgrim for which he won an Academy Award in 1986 for Best Live Action Short Film.

Brown also has directing credits in other television series including; The Wonder Years, L.A. Law, Hooperman, Freshman Dorm, Baby Boom and an episode of CBS Schoolbreak Special.

Brown has also produced and co-wrote the films Pontiac Moon (1994) starring Ted Danson and Mary Steenburgen and Dream with the Fishes (1997), both in collaboration with Finn Taylor. He directed the narrative feature film Sold (2014) based on Patricia McCormick's novel Sold.

References

External links

American film directors
American film producers
American male screenwriters
American television directors
Directors of Live Action Short Film Academy Award winners
Living people
Place of birth missing (living people)
Year of birth missing (living people)